Gennady Ivanovich Bukharin (16 March 1929 – 3 November 2020) was a Russian Soviet sprint canoeist.

He won the individual 1000 m and 10,000 m events at the 1958 World Championships and placed third in both at the 1956 Olympics.

References

External links

Article on Gennady Bukharin's 90th birthday 

1929 births
2020 deaths
Canoeists at the 1956 Summer Olympics
Soviet male canoeists
Olympic canoeists of the Soviet Union
Olympic bronze medalists for the Soviet Union
Olympic medalists in canoeing
Russian male canoeists
ICF Canoe Sprint World Championships medalists in Canadian
Medalists at the 1956 Summer Olympics
Sportspeople from Tatarstan